Briony Penn (born October 16, 1960, Saanich, British Columbia) is a Canadian author and environmental activist who received international attention when she protested logging on Salt Spring Island by riding horseback through downtown Vancouver while nearly nude and dressed as Lady Godiva. She won the Roderick Haig-Brown Regional Prize and was shortlisted for the Hubert Evans Non-Fiction Prize in 2016 for her book The Real Thing: The Natural History of Ian McTaggart Cowan (Rocky Mountain Books).

Early life and career
A fifth-generation islander, Penn was born and raised in Saanich, British Columbia. She graduated from the international baccalaureate program in Victoria (Norfolk House) in 1977. In 1981, she received her BA in Geography/Anthropology from the University of British Columbia. She then studied in Scotland, and in 1988 received her Ph.D in geography from the University of Edinburgh.

Penn is an adjunct professor of environmental studies at the University of Victoria and has lectured in the School of Environmental Studies and Restoration of Natural Systems Program since 1991. She was the Liberal Party of Canada's candidate for Saanich—Gulf Islands in the 40th Canadian federal election, Penn was narrowly defeated by Conservative incumbent Gary Lunn, then decided to leave politics.

Writing 
She wrote the book The Real Thing: The Natural History of Ian McTaggart Cowan, which won the 2016 Roderick Haig-Brown Regional Prize and was shortlisted for the 2016 Hubert Evans Non-Fiction Prize.

Environmental work
Penn co-founded The Land Conservancy of British Columbia in 1997 and serves on the board. In January 2001, Penn received international attention for her nearly-nude horseback ride as Lady Godiva to protest against logging on Saltspring Island.

Political career
After supporting the Green Party for more than a decade, Penn announced in March 2007 her intention to run as a Liberal candidate for Saanich—Gulf Islands in the 2008 federal election. She was defeated in a close race (43 to 39 percent) by the incumbent Conservative Gary Lunn, who was the Minister of Natural Resources. Conservative Senator Mike Duffy admitted "Lunn only won his riding in 2008 thanks to Conservative campaign guru Doug Finley’s black-ops magic" which involved the Conservative party's database using robocalls to direct NDP voters to vote for their candidate who remained on the ballot but was not running a campaign. She has stated she has retired from politics.

Electoral record

Biography 
Penn currently lives on Salt Spring Island, in a large heritage home brought from Victoria. She has raised two sons, Ronan and Callum, with her husband Donald.

References

External links
 Biography at Penn campaign website
 Biography of Briony Penn at her personal website
 ABCBookWorld article

Alumni of the University of Edinburgh
Canadian environmentalists
Canadian women environmentalists
British Columbia candidates for Member of Parliament
Living people
University of British Columbia alumni
Candidates in the 2008 Canadian federal election
Women in British Columbia politics
1960 births
21st-century Canadian women politicians
Liberal Party of Canada candidates for the Canadian House of Commons